Symphony No. 2 in D Major may refer to:

 Ludwig van Beethoven's Symphony No. 2 opus 36 (1802)
 Franz Berwald's Symphony No. 2, Capricieuse (1842)
 Johannes Brahms' Symphony No. 2, opus 73 (1877)
 Norbert Burgmüller's Symphony No. 2, opus 11 (1834–6)
 Muzio Clementi's Symphony "No. 2" WoO 33 (incomplete) (begun 1819) 
 Louise Farrenc's Symphony No. 2, opus 35 
 Frederic Ernest Fesca's Symphony No. 2, opus 10
 William Gilchrist's Symphony No. 2
 Leopold Hofmann's Symphony Kimball D2
 Franz Krommer's Symphony No. 2, opus 40 (published 1803) 
 Adolf Fredrik Lindblad's Symphony No. 2 (by 1855)
 Étienne Méhul's Symphony No. 2 (1808–9)
 Otto Nicolai's Symphony No. 2 (1845)
 Jean Sibelius' Symphony No. 2, opus 43 (1902)
 Christian Sinding's Symphony No. 2, opus 83 (1904)

See also
 List of symphonies in D major